This is an alphabetical list of historically notable members of the Society of Jesus.

A 
Piotr Abramowicz (1619-1697), Polish missionary
José de Acosta, Spanish historian; author of  The Natural and Moral History of the Indies
Rodolfo Acquaviva, Italian Jesuit missionary and priest in India
François d'Aguilon, Belgian mathematician and physicist
Mateo Aimerich, Spanish philologist  
Giacomo Maria Airoli, Italian Orientalist and scriptural commentator
Edward Alacampe, English philosopher; Procurator of Rome
Giulio Alenio, Italian missionary to China, called the "Confucius of the West"
Claude-Jean Allouez, French Jesuit, missionary to Wisconsin
Diego Francisco Altamirano, Spanish author
Charles Aylmer, Irish Jesuit, superior of the Dublin Residence 
Jean Joseph Marie Amiot, French missionary to China
José de Anchieta, Spanish missionary in Brazil, founder of São Paulo, Brazil
Saint Modeste Andlauer, martyred in China
Antal Andrassy, second Bishop of the Roman Catholic Diocese of Rozsnyó
Yves Marie André, French mathematician, philosopher, and essayist
Juan Andrés, prolific 18th-century Spanish writer
Renatus Andrieux, victim of the September massacres
Francesco degli Angeli, missionary to Ethiopia 
Johannes Arnoldi, German missionary, martyred in Germany
Saint Edmund Arrowsmith, one of the Forty Martyrs of England and Wales
Stefano Arteaga, Spanish writer
Fr. Pedro Arrupe, 28th Superior General of the Society of Jesus who led the first rescue party in Hiroshima after the dropping of the atomic bomb.
Xabier Arzalluz, Spanish Basque leader; later left the Society
Berndt David Assarsson (1892-1955), Swedish monsignor, historical author and psalmist
Joanna of Austria, Princess of Portugal, reputed to have taken the order's vows under the name Mateo Sánchez
Hyacinthe Robillard d'Avrigny (1675-1719), historian
Miguel de Ayatumo, venerated Filipino seminarian dubbed as "Saint Aloysius Gonzaga of the Philippines"

B 

Jakob Balde, German latinist, court chaplain to Maximillian I
John Ballard, English Jesuit priest executed for being involved in an attempt to assassinate Queen Elizabeth I of England
Hans Urs von Balthasar, 20th-century theologian, Jesuit from 1928 to 1950 when he left the order to found a new community with Adrienne von Speyr
Balthazar of Loyola, Moroccan prince who converted to Christianity and became a Jesuit priest
Cipriano Barace, Spanish missionary and martyr
Ignacio Martín-Baró, martyr in El Salvador
Pedro Barreto, Peruvian cardinal proclaimed by Pope Francis in 2018.
Augustin Barruel, French writer
Florian Baucke, Silesian and Bohemian Jesuit missionary to South America
Michel Baudouin, Superior-General of the Louisiana Mission (1749 to 1763)
Joseph Bayma, wrote "Molecular Mechanics" in 1866
Augustin Bea, German cardinal, Ecumenist at the Vatican II council
Nicolas-Ignace de Beaubois, French missionary to Quebec
Jan Beckx, Belgian Superior General (1853-1887)
Franz Jozef van Beeck, Dutch theologian who taught in the US
Joop Beek, Dutch and Indonesian educator and presidential political advisor
Johann Adam Schall von Bell, German missionary to China; astronomer
Saint Robert Bellarmine, Italian Cardinal and theologian, Doctor of the Church
Aloysius Bellecius (1704-1757), Jesuit ascetic author
Saint John Berchmans, Jesuit seminarian from Belgium
Jorge Mario Bergoglio, Argentinian, first Jesuit to be elected Pope (2013)
Thomas V. Bermingham, American academic who worked on The Exorcist
Prosper Bernard, Canadian missionary to China, killed by the Japanese
Joaquin G. Bernas, Filipino constitutionalist
Daniel Berrigan, American political activist, poet, and professor at Fordham University
Saint Jacques Berthieu, French Jesuit priest, missionary and first blessed Martyr of Madagascar
Blessed Jan Beyzym, Polish missionary to people with Leprosy in Madagascar
Giuseppe Biancani, very early selenographer
Jacob Bidermann, theologian and playwright - inspired Johann Wolfgang Goethe
Jacques de Billy, correspondent of Pierre de Fermat, many early contributions in number theory
Erwin Bischofberger, Swedish Jesuit and medical practitioner 
Leopold Biwald, 18th-century Austrian physics professor and textbook author
Saint Andrew Bobola, Polish missionary, martyred by the Cossacks
Nicholas Bock, Russian diplomat who later became a Jesuit priest
Michael Bordt, German philosopher and academic
Saint Francis Borgia, third Superior General of the Society
Ruggero Boscovich, Croatian scientist who made many contributions to physics and astronomy
Giovanni Botero, Italian thinker, discharged from the Society in 1579
Joachim Bouvet, early missionary to China and a leading member of the Figurist movement
Louis Bourdaloue, French preacher and orator
William S. Bowdern, exorcist who inspired the novel and film The Exorcist
Greg Boyle, director and founder of Homeboy Industries
Niklaus Brantschen, Swiss Zen master, author, and founder of the Lassalle-Institut
Saint Jean de Brébeuf, 17th-century French-Canadian missionary and martyr
Saint Alexander Briant, English martyr
Frank Brennan, Officer of the Order of Australia for services to Aboriginal Australians
Franz Brentano, philosopher who founded his own school of thought, the School of Brentano
John Brignon, translator of religious works into French
Peter Michael Brillmacher, German preacher during the Counter Reformation
Jean de Brisacier, controversialist and opponent of Jansenism
Saint John de Brito, Portuguese martyr and missionary to Madura, India (present-day Tamil Nadu)
Stephen Brown (Jesuit), founder of the Central Catholic Library
Tadeusz Brzozowski, Polish scholar, having secured its continuity during the suppression of the Society until its restoration, elected twentieth Superior General of the Society of Jesus and its first world-wide general.
Claude Buffier, aimed to discover the ultimate principal of knowledge, praised by Voltaire
Joannes Busaeus, theologian at Mainz University who wrote in defence of the introduction of the Gregorian calendar in Germany
William J. Byron, President of the University of Scranton (1975-1982), President of Catholic University of America (1982-1992), Interim President of Loyola University New Orleans (2003-2004), President of St. Joseph's Preparatory School (2006-2008)

C 
Niccolò Cabeo, many early contributions to physics
Pedro de Calatayud, missionary
Saint Edmund Campion, English martyr
Saint Petrus Canisius, Dutch theologian, writer of the widely used Little Catechism; Doctor of the Church
John Carroll, first bishop of the United States and founder of Georgetown University
Paolo Casati, Mathematician, supported Galileo
John II Casimir Vasa, king of the Polish–Lithuanian Commonwealth
Louis Bertrand Castel, French scientist
Leonardo Castellani, 20th-century Argentine writer and theologian
Giuseppe Castiglione, Italian Jesuit brother; artist to the Chinese Emperor
Saint Juan del Castillo, martyr of the Río de la Plata
Juan Paez de Castro, priest and confessor to King Philip II of Spain
Jean Pierre de Caussade, spiritual director, college rector, and author of Abandonment to Divine Providence
Jean-Antoine du Cerceau, French Jesuit priest, poet, and playwright
Michel de Certeau, French cultural theorist
Francesco Cetti, mathematician and zoologist
Saint Noël Chabanel, North American martyr
Pierre Teilhard de Chardin, French paleontologist, theologian/philosopher and spiritual writer

Timoléon Cheminais de Montaigu, 17th century orator
Pierre Cholenec, Superior of Montreal
Drew Christiansen, nuclear expert and disarmament consultant to the Holy See.
Walter Ciszek, missionary and religious prisoner in Soviet Union; author
Saint Peter Claver, Spanish missionary in South America
Christopher Clavius main architect of the modern Gregorian calendar
Saint Claude de la Colombière, preacher to the seventh Duchess of York, Mary of Modena
Louis le Comte, early missionary to China
Guy Consolmagno, Vatican astronomer 
Frederick Copleston, English writer, author of the definitive History of Philosophy
Honoré-Gaspard de Coriolis, French cleric and historian
John M. Corridan, labor activist and "Waterfront priest" whose story inspired the classic film On the Waterfront
Horacio de la Costa, Philippine historian and the first Filipino Jesuit provincial superior in the Philippines
Jacques Courtois, 17th-century French painter
François Crépieul, 17th-century French missionary in Canada
Saint Roque González de Santa Cruz, Paraguayan missionary and martyr
James Cullen, Irish temperance campaigner who founded the Pioneer Total Abstinence Association
Johann Baptist Cysat, published the first printed European book concerning Japan
Stanislaus Czerniewicz, Lithuanian-Polish priest, elected vicar general for Jesuits in Russia when the Society of Jesus was suppressed.
Stanisław Czerski, Polish graphic designer

D 

Claude Dablon, Superior General of all the Canadian missions from 1670 to 1680
Saint Antoine Daniel, North American martyr
Cardinal Jean Daniélou, author, scholar, and member of the French Academy
Alfred Delp, German hanged for his opposition to Hitler
Saint Paul Denn, martyred in China
Robert De Nobili, famous Italian missionary to India (Madurai Mission), who tried to inculturate Christian values to the Indian culture
Henri Depelchin, Belgian missionary, pioneer, writer and educator in India and Africa
Ippolito Desideri, Italian Jesuit missionary to Tibet
Paul de Barry, rector of the Jesuit colleges at Aix, Nîmes, and Avignon, and Provincial of Lyon.
Pierre-Jean De Smet, active missionary among the Native Americans of the Western United States in the mid-19th century
Richard De Smet, Jesuit Indologist (Sankara specialist), Professor of Phisosophy, JnanaDeep Vidyapeeth, Pune, Maharashtra, India; prolific writer and contributor to the Marathi Encyclopaedia of Philosophy
William Detré, 17th century missionary in the Amazon
Salvatore di Pietro, Italian missionary and first apostolic prefect to Belize, Central America
Pedro Díaz, missionary
John Donne, English poet and cleric in the Church of England (no evidence) 
Eduardo Dougherty, American-Brazilian educator, communicator and leader of the Catholic Charismatic Renewal in Brazil
Robert Drinan, first Catholic priest to serve as a voting member of U.S. Congress (congressman from Massachusetts)
Gabriel Druillettes, Apostle of Maine, missionary and explorer
Francis Bennon Ducrue, Bavarian missionary to Mexico
Peter Dufka, Slovakian priest and professor at the Pontifical Oriental Institute in Rome
Cardinal Avery Dulles, American theologian and professor at Fordham University
Jacques Dupuis, theologian, edited The Christian Faith which went to seven editions

E 
Ignacio Ellacuría, rector of University of Central America; murdered in 1989
Saint Philip Evans, one of the Forty Martyrs of England and Wales

F 
Saint Peter Faber, early companion of Ignatius of Loyola, co-founder of the Society of Jesus; missionary in Germany
Honoré Fabri, first to explain why the sky is blue
Jean-Charles della Faille, first to determine the center of gravity of the sector of a circle
Thomas Falkner, English Jesuit missionary
Leonard Feeney, ultra-conservative American theologian
Wolfgang Feneberg, German Jesuit convert to Evangelical Lutheranism
Richard Michael Fernando, Filipino Jesuit cleric, missionary in Cambodia and Servant of God
Joseph M. Finotti, pastor of Saint Mary's parish in Alexandria, Virginia; pastor of Saint Ignatius parish in Oxon Hill, Maryland; librarian at Georgetown University in Washington, D.C.
Pierre-René Floquet, Quebec-based priest sympathetic to the Americans during the American Revolutionary War
Jean de Fontaney, missionary to China
Balthazar Francolini, attritionist professor at the Gregorian University who wrote Clericus Romanus Contra Nimium Rigorismum Munitus in 1707 against Jansenism
Luís Fróis, Portuguese missionary to Japan; author of a history of Japan
Fabian Fucan, Japanese Jesuit brother who converted to Zen Buddhism
Jon Fuller, medical doctor known for his work with AIDS patients

G 

Père Louis Gaillard, French missionary to China
Marion M. Ganey, pioneer in credit union and coop movement in British Honduras and in the South Pacific
Saint Henry Garnet, first English Provincial; executed after being implicated in the Gunpowder Plot
Saint Charles Garnier, North America martyr
John Gerard, English Jesuit; one of the few men to escape from the Tower of London
Jean-François Gerbillon, early missionary to China
Aquiles Gerste, philologist and linguist best known for his ethnographic and linguistic studies of the indigenous peoples of Mexico
Niccolò Gianpriamo, Italian missionary to China, astronomer
Filippo Salvatore Gilii, contributor in the field of South American historical linguistics
Paul Goethals, Belgian, first Archbishop of Calcutta
Saint Aloysius Gonzaga, Italian jesuit; patron saint of students
Thyrsus González, Spanish 13th Superior General of the Society of Jesus
John Goodman, jailed in England during the Long Parliament
Saint John Soan de Goto, martyred in Japan
Saint René Goupil, Jesuit brother and North American martyr
Baltasar Gracián, Spanish prose writer
Francesco Maria Grimaldi, 17th-century Italian mathematician, physicist and astronomer; accurately mapped the Moon; one of the first to suggest the wave-like nature of light
Saint Melchior Grodziecki, Polish martyr, patron of the city of Katowice
Gabriel Gruber, Viennese teacher, elected Vicar General of the Russian province during there suppression of the Society 
Paul Guldin father of Guldinus theorem
José Gumilla, naturalist who studied the Orinoco, South America
Bartolomeu de Gusmão, Brazilian-Portuguese priest and mathematician; said to be an early inventor of the dirigible

H 

Juraj Habdelić, Croatian writer and lexicographer
Walter Halloran, assistant in the exorcism which inspired the novel and film The Exorcist
John Hardon, wrote The Catholic Catechism and many other works
Peter Hasslacher, German preacher
Irénée Hausherr, Alsatian specialist in Greek patristic and monastic spirituality
Bernhard Havestadt, German missionary in Chile
Timothy Healy, late president of Georgetown University and president of the New York Public Library system
Martin Heidegger, German philosopher who was briefly a Jesuit novice
Raymond Helmick, American theologian and author
Daniel S. Hendrickson, 25th president of Creighton University 
David Francis Hickey, American missionary bishop of Belize, Central America
Robert Louis Hodapp, American missionary bishop of Belize, Central America
John-Baptist Hoffmann, German Apostle of the Mundas in India
Ferdinand Augustin Hallerstein, missionary to China that was made a mandarin
Christopher Holywood, Irish priest of the Counter-Reformation
Eduardo Hontiveros, Filipino philosopher, theologian and composer of sacred and liturgical music
Frederick C. Hopkins, English missionary to Belize Central America; bishop and vicar apostolic
Gerard Manley Hopkins, renowned English poet
Johann Baptiste Horvath, 18th-century Hungarian/Slovak physics professor and textbook author
Vincent Houdry, preacher and writer
Gerard W. Hughes, Scottish Jesuit priest and spiritual writer
Franz Hunolt, German priest and author
Saint Alberto Hurtado, social reformer in Chile

I 
Blessed John Ingram
Saint Rémy Isoré, martyred in China
Angelo Italia, 17th century Sicilian architect

J 
Andreas Jaszlinszky, 18th-century Hungarian physics professor and textbook author
Saint Francis de Geronimo, Italian priest and missionary
Franz Jetzinger, theology professor, Austrian political figure, and principal biographer of Adolf Hitler's early years
Pierre Johanns, Luxemburger priest and missionary in India
Saint Isaac Jogues, 17th-century French martyr and missionary to North America
Miguel Agustín Pro Juárez, Mexican priest, executed during the persecution of the Catholic Church under the presidency of Plutarco Elías Calles
Claude Judde, 18th century French teacher

K 

Georg Joseph Kamel, Czech botanist assigned to the Philippines; the Camellia flower was named after him
Sebastian Kappen, Indian theologian
Franciszek Kareu, Polonised architect of British descent who was elected Vice General of the Russian province during the suppression of the Society
Blessed Leonardo Kimura, Japanese martyr
Eusebio Francisco Kino, missionary and cartographer of Mexico and Arizona
Athanasius Kircher, 17th-century German scientist; discoverer of microbes
Saint James Kisai, Japanese martyr
Lev Kobylinsky, Russian poet, translator and religious theorist
Adam Adamandy Kochański, Polish mathematician and clockmaker
Anthony Kohlmann, early Catholic priest in New York whose decision not to testify established American precedent for "priest-penitent privilege" or "clergy confidentiality" in law
Peter Hans Kolvenbach, linguist; 29th Superior General of the Society of Jesus
Adam Krupski, professor of philosophy, legal expert on the legislation of the Grand Duchy of Lithuania, author of the school dialogue.
Cardinal Ján Chryzostom Korec, Prisoner for Christ
Saint Stanislaus Kostka, patron saint of Jesuit novices
George Kovalenko, Russian convert from Eastern Orthodoxy
Adam Kozłowiecki, Polish Dachau concentration camp survivor, missionary in Zambia, archbishop of Lusaka and Cardinal
Franz Xaver Kugler, Doctor of chemistry and mathematics; famous also for his Babylonian studies
Kurien Kunnumpuram, Indian theologian (Ecclesiology) 
Thomas Kunnunkal, Indian educationist and writer

L 

Saint Jean de Lalande, North American martyr
Saint Gabriel Lalemant, North American martyr
Quentin Lauer, American priest, philosopher and Hegel scholar
Pierre de Lauzon, superior of the Jesuits in New France
Włodzimierz Ledóchowski, Polish Superior General of the Society of Jesus
Gabriel Lenkiewicz, Polish teacher and architect, elected Vicar General of the Russian province during there suppression of the Society 
Leonardus Lessius, Belgian moral theologian and writer on economics
Saint David Lewis, Welsh martyr
Constant Lievens, Apostle of Chotanagpur, Flemish Jesuit who worked among the Adivasis of Central India
Segundo Llorente, Spanish-born priest in rural western Alaska; was elected by write-in vote to the Alaska House of Representatives in 1960 by residents of the Wade Hampton district, becoming the first Catholic priest to serve in a U.S. state legislature
William Lonc, professor of physics and translator of French-Canadian Jesuit records into English
Bernard Lonergan, Canadian philosopher and theologian, Companion of the Order of Canada
Saint Ignatius of Loyola, co-founder and first Superior General of the Society of Jesus
Cardinal Henri de Lubac, French theologian, and patrologist

M 

Marius Macrionitis, Archbishop of Athens
Jack Mahoney, ethicist and moral theologian 
Louis Maimbourg
Matt Malone, 14th editor in chief of America magazine
Joseph Maréchal, Belgian transcendental philosopher
Juan de Mariana
Jacques Marquette, French explorer of the Mississippi and Northern Michigan areas
James Martin, author of My Life With the Saints and The Jesuit Guide to (Almost) Everything; culture editor of the America magazine
Malachi Martin, author of sixteen books, had three Ph.Ds, spoke ten languages
Ignacio Martín-Baró, martyr of El Salvador
Martino Martini, Italian missionary to China, linguist and published the first Chinese Atlas and the first Ancient History and a chronicle of the tartarian war
Cardinal Carlo Maria Martini, Italian scripture scholar, Archbishop Emeritus of Milan
William Francis Masterson, American educator to the Philippines; (Ateneo de Manila University, Xavier University – Ateneo de Cagayan), founder of the Xavier University - Ateneo de Cagayan College of Agriculture
Saint Lèon-Ignance Mangin, martyred in China
Juan Francisco Masdeu, historian
Blessed Julien Maunoir, 17th-century missionary to the Breton people
Blessed Rupert Mayer, Servant of God, resisted the Nazis
John McElroy, one of two of the Army's first Catholic Chaplains. Chaplain during the Mexican–American War, founder of St. John's Literary Institute, Boston College High School, and Boston College.
Horace McKenna, founder of So Others Might Eat and advocate of the Sursum Corda Cooperative
John McLaughlin, American political commentator; left the Jesuits after a failed bid for a Senate seat in Rhode Island
Richard McSorley (1914-2002) peace activist; peace studies Professor at Georgetown University.
Domingo Patricio Meagher, Spanish writer and university professor of Irish descent
Anthony de Mello, Indian spiritual guide and writer
Everard Mercurian, Belgian, 4th Superior General of the Society of Jesus
Brice Meuleman, Belgian, 2nd Archbishop of Calcutta (now Kolkata)
Saint Paulo Miki, Japanese martyr
Jorge Loring Miró, Spanish Jesuit
Ignacio Molarja, explorer and missionary to New Spain
Segundo Montes, martyr of El Salvador
Saint Henry Morse, English martyr
Simon Le Moyne, French New World explorer
Franz Magnis-Suseno, German-born Indonesian Jesuit priest and philosopher
W. G. Read Mullan, American academic and university president
Joseph Anthony Murphy, Irish missionary, bishop and vicar apostolic to Belize, Central America
John Courtney Murray, American theologian credited with the drafting of the Second Vatican Council Declaration on Religious Freedom

N 
John E. Naus, dean of students and associate professor at Marquette University
Bienvenido Nebres, Philippine National Scientist, mathematician & former president of the Ateneo de Manila University
Oswald von Nell-Breuning, German 'father' of Catholic social teaching (1890-1991)
Terence Netter, painter and former priest
Adolfo Nicolás, 30th Superior General of the Society of Jesus
Roberto de Nobili, Italian missionary to India; linguist
Manuel da Nóbrega, Portuguese founder of the Brazilian city of Rio de Janeiro
Charles de Noyelle, Belgian 12th Superior General of the Society of Jesus

O 
Mikołaj Stanisław Oborski (1576-1646), Polish teacher
Bernard Michael O'Brien, New Zealand Jesuit priest and philosopher
Joseph T. O'Callahan, U.S. Navy chaplain; awarded Medal of Honor
Saint John Ogilvie, Scottish martyr
Joseph A. O'Hare, former president of Fordham University and chairman of the New York City Charter Revision Commission and the first New York City Campaign Finance Board
Gian Paolo Oliva, Italian 11th Superior General of the Society of Jesus
John W. O'Malley, American academic and Catholic historian
William O'Malley, author and actor (played Father Joe Dyer in The Exorcist)
Walter J. Ong, American cultural historian and spiritual writer
Wilhelm Josef Oomens, painter 
John H. O'Rourke American retreat leader and master of novices
Saint Nicholas Owen, martyr saint of England and Wales

P 
Mitch Pacwa, scholar; host on EWTN
Francesco Palliola, Italian missionary and martyr in the Philippines
Kuruvilla Pandikattu, Indian philosopher
Lorenzo Hervás y Panduro, pioneer philologist
Raimon Panikkar, Spanish priest, theologian, philosopher, interfaith dialogist, scholar, writer and chemist
Álvarez de Paz, preacher and mystic
Péter Pázmány, Cardinal, Archbishop of Esztergom, leader of the Catholic revival in Hungary
Ferdinand Perier, Belgian, 3rd Archbishop of Calcutta (now Kolkata)
Denis Pétau, French scholar and theologian
François Para du Phanjas, French writer
Giambattista Pianciani, Italian scientist
Joseph Pignatelli, Italian leader of the Jesuits in exile
John Pinasco, Italian theologian and educator to America
Luca Pinelli, Italian scholar and theologian
Bartolomé Pou, Spanish writer
John Powell, American author and professor
Andrea Pozzo, great artist of the Baroque genre

R 
Karl Rahner, 20th-century German theologian
Samuel Rayan, Indian proponent of liberation theology
Saint Bernardino Realino, pastor of Lecce
Sebastian Redford, 18th-century author
Joseph Redlhamer, 18th-century Austrian physics professor and textbook author
Saint John Francis Regis, French rural missionary preacher
Karl Leonhard Reinhold
Franz Retz, Czech 15th Superior General of the Society of Jesus
Johann Baptist Reus, German-Brazilian religious leader
Alexandre de Rhodes, French missionary to Vietnam; linguist
Servant of God Matteo Ricci, Italian missionary to China, linguist and published the first Chinese edition of Euclid's Elements
Giovanni Battista Riccioli, 17th-century Italian astronomer; devised the system for the nomenclature of lunar features that is now the international standard
William A. Rice, American missionary, founder of Baghdad College, bishop and vicar apostolic in Belize
Didier Rimaud, French composer and poet
Alberto Rivera, claimed to be ex-Jesuit (disputed by Catholic Church), anti-Catholic activist
Saint Alonso Rodriguez, martyr of the Río de la Plata
Saint Alphonsus Rodriguez, Jesuit brother; mystic
João Rodrigues Tçuzu ("the Translator"), 16th-century Portuguese missionary who served as a translator for Toyotomi Hideyoshi and Tokugawa Ieyasu, wrote early works on Japanese linguistics, and introduced Western science and culture to Korea through his gifts to the ambassador Jeong Duwon
Saint José María Rubio, Spanish priest; canonized in 2003
Antonio Ruiz de Montoya, Jesuit missionary in Paraguay

S 
Grégoire de Saint-Vincent, contributions to the theory of logarithms
Karel San Juan, Filipino president of Ateneo de Zamboanga University
Maciej Kazimierz Sarbiewski, Polish Latin poet of the Counter-Reformation, crowned poet laureate by Pope Urban VIII
Alonso de Sandoval, missionary to African slaves in Cartagena de Indias, mentor of Saint Peter Claver
Johann Schreck, 17th-century German polymath and missionary to China
Gaspar Schott, first published mention of the universal joint
Angelo Secchi, astronomer
Juan Luis Segundo, liberation theologian
Gerolamo Sersale, astronomer
Thomas Ewing Sherman, son of U.S. Civil War General William T. Sherman
Swami Shilananda, Spanish missionary who spent his active years in India
Piotr Skarga, Polish polemicist, leading figure of the Counter-Reformation in the Polish–Lithuanian Commonwealth and hagiographer
Tadeusz Ślipko, Polish ethicist 
Pierre-Jean De Smet, American explorer and missionary

Jan Mikołaj Smogulecki, introduced logarithms to China
Cypriano de Soarez, author of De Arte Rhetorica
Jon Sobrino, author of Christology at the Crossroads, liberation theologian
Carlos Sommervogel, scholar and author of Bibliothèque de la Compagnie de Jesus
Arturo Sosa, 31st Superior General of the Society of Jesus
Saint Robert Southwell, Elizabethan poet and martyr 
Cardinal Tomáš Špidlík, Czech theologian and professor
Buck Stanton (Jesuit), naturalist and Jesuit missionary to British Honduras.
Walter Steins Bisschop, 19th-century Dutch bishop, Vicar Apostolic of Bombay and then Calcutta and 3rd Bishop of Auckland, New Zealand
Andrew Sterpin, Chinese-born Russian priest who was influential in both Russian and French culture
Francisco Suárez, scholastic philosopher
 Blessed John Sullivan (Jesuit)|, Irish convert and teacher; renowned for his special interest in the poor
Jón Sveinsson, Icelandic poet and writer
Martin Szentiványi, writer
Ignacije Szentmartony, Croatian mathematician and astronomer
Stan Swamy, tribal rights activist

T 

Joel Tabora, Filipino philosopher and president of Ateneo de Davao University
Guy Tachard, two important embassies to Siam
André Tacquet, Flemish mathematician whose works facilitated the discovery of calculus
Michelangelo Tamburini, Italian 14th Superior General of the Society of Jesus
Pierre Teilhard de Chardin, French paleontologist, theologian and writer
Francesco Lana de Terzi, creator of the first realistic technical plans for an airship
Richard Thimelby, 17th century English missionary priest, Rector of the College of St Omer
Antoine Thomas, Belgian astronomer in China
Vitus Georg Tönnemann, German priest who was the only confessor to Emperor Charles VI of France from 1711 to 1740 
Girolamo Francesco Tornielli, Italian preacher and writer
Cosme de Torrès, contemporary of Francis Xavier
Diego de Torres Bello, pioneer of the Paraguay province
Pascal Tosi, Italian co-founder of the Alaska Mission
Nicolas Trigault, early missionary to China
Michael Alphonsius Shen Fu-Tsung, first Mandarin-speaking Chinese to become a Jesuit
John Nepomuk Tschupick, Austrian preacher
George Tyrrell, Anglo-Irish modernist theologian and scholar

U 
Juan José Urráburu, scholastic philosopher

V 

Luca Valerio, corresponded with Galileo Galilei
Alessandro Valignano, Italian canonical visitor to the Asian missions; promoter of an inculturated missionary approach
Carlos G. Vallés, writer of Gujarati, English and Spanish languages; and mathematics
Albert Vanhoye, Biblical scholar and cardinal
John Vattanky, Indian classical philosopher
José María Vélaz, founder of Fe y Alegría
Ferdinand Verbiest, Belgian missionary to China; astronomer and mathematician
António Vieira, 17th-century Portuguese missionary and diplomat
Juan Bautista Villalpando, Isaac Newton referred to his works
Grégoire de Saint-Vincent, Flemish mathematician
Claude de Visdelou, early missionary to China

W 
Edmund A. Walsh, founder of the School of Foreign Service at Georgetown University
Saint Henry Walpole, English martyr
Heinrich Wangnereck, German theologian, preacher, and author
Anthony Watsham, entomologist with emphasis on scelionidae
Andrew White (Jesuit), 17th century English Jesuit, influential figure in the early Maryland Colony who led efforts to convert and improve relations with local Native American tribes. 
George J. Willmann, American priest regarded as the "Father of the Knights of Columbus in the Philippines" and Servant of God
Garry Wills, Pulitzer Prize-winning author (briefly a Jesuit)
Jakub Wujek, scholar and translator

X 
Saint Francis Xavier, co-founder of the Society of Jesus and missionary to Asia who initiated a large conversion movement in India, Malacca, and Japan
Georges Xenopulos, Greek bishop

Z 
Domenico Zipoli, Italian composer and musician
Petrus Josephus Zoetmulder, expert in the Old Javanese language and literature
Giovanni Battista Zupi, mathematician, astronomer

See also
List of former Jesuits
List of Jesuit theologians
List of Jesuit Saints
List of Jesuit scientists
Canadian Martyrs
Jesuit China missions

Notes

References

External links
The Jesuit Portal – Jesuit Worldwide Homepage

 List
Jesuits
Lists of clerics
Lists of men